Lee Moon-sae (born January 17, 1959) is a South Korean ballad singer who is often considered a Korean pop icon. Since his debut in 1978, he has released 16 full-length albums, including 1987's When Love Passes By, which sold 2.85 million copies, making it the best-selling album in South Korea to date at the time. He is also well known for being the host of the popular South Korean radio show, Starry Night, on MBC FM, from 1985 to 1996. He diagnosed with thyroid cancer in 2007.

Discography

Awards

References

External links
 

1959 births
Living people
20th-century South Korean male singers
South Korean folk rock singers
South Korean pop singers
South Korean guitarists
South Korean television presenters
South Korean radio presenters
Myongji University alumni
Musicians from Seoul
21st-century South Korean male singers